Tennys Sandgren was the defending champion, however he lost in the first round to James Duckworth.

Adrian Mannarino won the title, defeating Frederik Nielsen in the final, 6–2, 6–2.

Seeds

Draw

Finals

Top half

Bottom half

References
 Main Draw
 Qualifying Draw

JSM Challenger of Champaign-Urbana
JSM Challenger of Champaign–Urbana